Eisob Dinratri is a 1985 Bangla family-drama written by Humayun Ahmed. It aired on BTV. The drama tells the story of a middle class joint family living in the capital city Dhaka.

It depicted a middle class Bangladeshi family's day to day life, including love, marriage, death and other issues. The story ends with the death of a young girl called Tuni due to Leukemia. Viewers had demanded that its creator Humayun Ahmed save the character, but Ahmed refused to change his original story. Humayun Ahmed allegedly wrote the story to raise enough money to buy a television which was expensive back then. He stopped writing the story once his original goal had been fulfilled which later drew criticism from the actors and actresses involved in the show.

Cast
 Kazi Mehfuzul Haque as Father
 Dilara Zaman as Mother
 Bulbul Ahmed as Shafique
 Dolly Johur as Neelu
 Asaduzzaman Noor as Rafique
 Lutfun Nahar Lata as Sharmin
 Khaled Khan as Anis
 Shilpi Sarkar Apu as Shahana
 Nayar Sultana Lopa as Tuni 
 Abul Khair as Kabir Mama
 Masud Ali Khan as Neelu's boss
 Enamul Haque as Mr. Karim, Neelu's colleague
 Abul Hayat as Dulabhai
 Raisul Islam Asad as Jahir, Shahana's Husband
 Shuja Khondokar as Sadek Ali
 Jamaluddin Hossain as Sharmin's Father
Guest Appearances
 Jewel Aich as himself

References

External links
 

1980s Bangladeshi television series
Bangladeshi drama television series
Bengali-language television programming in Bangladesh
Bangladesh Television original programming